Vitéz Lajos Csatay de Csataj (born as Lajos Tutzentaller on 1 August 1886 – 16 October 1944) was a Hungarian military officer and politician, who served as Minister of Defence between June 1943 and October 1944.

Life

World War I and the Interwar
He fought in World War I and then joined the Hungarian Red Army to fight against the rebelling Slovakian, Romanian, and other nationalists. Between 1919 and 1921 he was a teacher of the Military Academy of Budapest. From 1926 he was a commander of a mixed brigade.

World War II 
In the first year of World War II, he was Chief of Artillery Field Training, until 1 August 1941, when he became commander of the IV Army Corps. 
With this Corps, he served on the battlefield in the Soviet Union until 3 December 1942, when he was recalled to Hungary, to reform and lead the Hungarian Third Army.
Then Miklós Kállay appointed him as Minister of Defence in June 1943. Initially he supported the Nazis and the continuation of the war, but his opinion changed continuously. After the replacement of the Sztójay administration he kept his position. Géza Lakatos, the new prime minister's real aim was leaving the war.

Operation Panzerfaust 
The cabinet wanted to initiate peace negotiations with the Allies. Miklós Horthy moved to reconsolidate his influence and began considering strategies for surrendering to the Western Allies because he distrusted the Red Army. The attempted coup was unsuccessful. Horthy was captured by Edmund Veesenmayer and his staff later on 15 October and taken to the Waffen SS office, where he was held overnight. 
Lajos Csatay was arrested by the Gestapo; as a result he committed suicide along with his wife.

References

 Magyar Életrajzi Lexikon

1886 births
1944 deaths
People from Arad, Romania
Austro-Hungarian Army officers
Austro-Hungarian military personnel of World War I
Defence ministers of Hungary
Hungarian soldiers
Hungarian politicians who committed suicide
Suicides in Hungary